Rieser Mill is a historic grist mill and miller's house located in Bern Township, Berks County, Pennsylvania.  The mill was built in 1825, and is a 2 1/2-story, rectangular stone banked building with a gable roof. The building replaced an earlier mill on the same site. The miller's house is a "T"-shaped, stone and brick dwelling.  It was built in 1784, and enlarged in the late 1800s.   The mill is located approximately 1/4-mile from the Rieser-Shoemaker Farm.

It was listed on the National Register of Historic Places in 1990.

Gallery

References

Grinding mills in Berks County, Pennsylvania
Grinding mills on the National Register of Historic Places in Pennsylvania
Industrial buildings completed in 1825
Houses in Berks County, Pennsylvania
National Register of Historic Places in Berks County, Pennsylvania
1825 establishments in Pennsylvania